Lijndenia barteri (synonyms: Spathandra barteri, Memecylon dinklagei, Memecylon pynaertii, and basionym Memecylon barteri) is a species of shrub in the family Melastomataceae. It is endemic to lowland Upper Guinean forests of West Africa. It is threatened by habitat loss.

References

barteri
Flora of West Tropical Africa
Vulnerable plants
Taxonomy articles created by Polbot
Taxobox binomials not recognized by IUCN